The men's sanda 56 kg at the 2002 Asian Games in Busan, South Korea was held from 10 to 13 October at the Dongseo University Minseok Sports Center.

A total of 14 men from 14 different countries competed in this event, limited to fighters whose body weight was less than 56 kilograms.

Sanchai Chomphuphuang from Thailand won the gold medal after beating Rexel Nganhayna of the Philippines in gold medal bout 2–1, The bronze medal was shared by Ölziibadrakhyn Saruul-Od from Mongolia and Yeh Chun-chang of Chinese Taipei.

Schedule
All times are Korea Standard Time (UTC+09:00)

Results
Legend
KO — Won by knockout
RET — Won by retirement

References

2002 Asian Games Report, Page 790
Results

External links
Official website

Men's sanda 56 kg